As of May 2022, LATAM Chile (formerly LAN Airlines) serves to the destinations below. For destinations solely served by its subsidiaries, see LATAM Colombia, LATAM Ecuador and LATAM Perú.

Map

Destinations

References

www.lan.com

LAN Airlines
Lists of airline destinations